"Go Hard" is the second single from DJ Khaled's third studio album, We Global.
The hip-hop track features American rappers Kanye West and T-Pain and their trademark auto-tune effect. The song is produced by The Runners and it samples Madonna's 1985 song "Angel". It first charted on the Bubbling Under R&B/Hip Hop chart on December 4, 2008, debuting at number 25, where it peaked at number 15, and charted on the Hot R&B/Hip-Hop Songs debuting at number 85 and then rising to number 53. It also debuted at number 69 on the Billboard Hot 100 the same week the album We Global was released due to digital downloads, also at number 19 on the Hot Rap Tracks.

"Go Hard" is featured in the 2008 video game Grand Theft Auto IV from Rockstar Games. It is featured on the in-game radio station The Beat 102.7.

Music video
The official video (directed by Hype Williams) was released on November 7. The low budget music video features cameos from Ace Hood, Rick Ross, Tyson Beckford, Tay Dizm and DJ Clue among others. The video for T-Pain's song "Karaoke" was shot on the same day.

Legacy
There have been several remixes and freestyle raps of the song.

Remixes
 The Hits Collection, Volume One features a remix with a verse by Jay-Z replacing the first verse by Kanye West, and a new intro and outro by Khaled. It was released on the internet on December 28, 2008.
 There is a remix that retains the verses by Kanye West and chorus by T-Pain, and adds a verse by Twista.
 There is a remix with rapper Juelz Santana.

Freestyles
 Chamillionaire released a freestyle of "Go Hard" titled "Keep Hatin" on the 2008 mixtape, Mixtape Messiah 5.
 Nicki Minaj released a freestyle of "Go Hard" in 2009 titled "Go Hard".

Charts

References

External links
 Dj Khaled (Feat. Kanye West & T-Pain) - "Go Hard" music video

2008 singles
DJ Khaled songs
Kanye West songs
Music videos directed by Hype Williams
T-Pain songs
Song recordings produced by the Runners
Songs written by DJ Khaled
Songs written by T-Pain
Songs written by Kanye West
2008 songs
MNRK Music Group singles
Songs written by Stephen Bray
Songs written by Madonna